Vážany is a municipality and village in Vyškov District in the South Moravian Region of the Czech Republic. It has about 500 inhabitants.

Notable people
Antonín Procházka (1882–1945), painter

References

Villages in Vyškov District